Lac Beauregard Water Aerodrome  is located on Lac Beauregard, Quebec, Canada and is open from the middle of May until October.

References

Registered aerodromes in Laurentides
Seaplane bases in Quebec